Live 12-5-87 (Aprite i vostri occhi) is the first live album from Italian rock band Litfiba and was recorded in Florence during the tour that followed the 17 RE album.

Track listing
"Come un Dio" – 8:03
"Resta" – 2:57
"La preda" – 3:11
"Cane" – 4:07
"Tziganata'' – 4:32
"Ferito" – 7:28
"Apapaia" – 5:02
"Re del silenzio" – 5:19
"Vendette/Luna" – 17:17
"Ballata" – 5:13

Personnel
Piero Pelù – Vocals
Ghigo Renzulli – Guitars
Ringo de Palma – Drums
Antonio Aiazzi – Keyboards
Gianni Maroccolo – Bass

External links

Litfiba albums
1987 live albums
Warner Records live albums
Italian-language live albums